Not of this World or Fuori Dal Mondo (lit. "outside the world") is a 1999 Italian drama film directed by Giuseppe Piccioni.

Plot
The film follows a nun whose life is upended when she is handed an abandoned infant in a park. She takes the baby to the hospital and proceeds to track down the mother. Along the way she meets the owner of a dry cleaning business whose sweater was wrapped around the baby, and begins to wonder if convent life is right for her.

Cast
Margherita Buy: Sister Caterina
Silvio Orlando: Ernesto
Carolina Freschi: Teresa
Maria Cristina Minerva: Esmeralda
Giuliana Lojodice: Caterina's Mother
Chantal Ughi

Soundtrack
The soundtrack was composed by Ludovico Einaudi.

Track listing

References

External links

1999 films
1999 drama films
Italian drama films
1990s Italian-language films
Films set in Milan
Films directed by Giuseppe Piccioni
Films scored by Ludovico Einaudi
1990s Italian films